Mofo may refer to:
 An abbreviation for Motherfucker
 "Mofo" (song), from the 1997 U2 album Pop
 MONA FOMA, an Australian music and art festival
 Morrison & Foerster, a large law firm based in San Francisco, California

See also
 The MOFO Project/Object, 2006 Frank Zappa album box set